Louisiana Highway 181 (LA 181) is a state highway located in central Louisiana.  It runs  in a north–south direction from LA 115 in Lone Pine to U.S. Highway 71 (US 71) in Cheneyville.

The route connects the small town of Cheneyville in southeastern Rapides Parish with Interstate 49 (I-49) and points along rural LA 115.

Route description
From the south, LA 181 begins at an intersection with LA 115 at a point known as Lone Pine in northern Evangeline Parish.  LA 115 heads east toward Bunkie and south toward St. Landry.  From this intersection, LA 181 proceeds north along Cheneyville Road.   later, after curving to the northeast, LA 181 crosses into Rapides Parish.

 across the parish line, LA 181 passes through an interchange with I-49, which connects to Alexandria on the north and Opelousas on the south.  LA 181 continues northeast for another , where it enters the town of Cheneyville on Greenwood Avenue.  Immediately after crossing the Union Pacific Railroad (UP) tracks, the route ends at an intersection with US 71 (Front Street).  US 71 parallels I-49 northward toward Alexandria and heads southeast toward Baton Rouge.

The route is classified as a rural minor collector by the Louisiana Department of Transportation and Development (La DOTD) with an average daily traffic volume of 620 in 2013. LA 181 is an undivided two-lane highway for the majority of its route, widening briefly to a divided four-lane highway through the interchange with I-49.

History
In the original Louisiana Highway system in use between 1921 and 1955, the modern LA 181 made up the northern portion of State Route 271.  Route 271 was designated in 1928 by an act of the state legislature.  It roughly followed the present route of LA 115 from LA 106 west of St. Landry northward along Bayou Cocodrie to Lone Pine.  From there, it continued along the present route of LA 181 to US 71 in Cheneyville.  Here, it made a jog southeast onto US 71 then north through town across Bayou Boeuf, ending at Bayou Road.  The route was originally projected to continue northward to Echo, but no such roadway was built in the pre-1955 system.

LA 181 was created with the 1955 Louisiana Highway renumbering following the portion of former Route 271 from Lone Pine to Cheneyville.  Its route has remained the same to the present day.

Future
Under this plan of "right-sizing" the state highway system, the entire route of LA 181 is proposed for deletion as it does not meet a significant interurban travel function.

Major intersections

See also

References

External links

Maps / GIS Data Homepage, Louisiana Department of Transportation and Development

0181
Transportation in Evangeline Parish, Louisiana
Transportation in Rapides Parish, Louisiana